Kushki-ye Sofla (also Romanized as Kūshkī-ye Soflá and Gūshkī-ye Soflá; also known as Gūshki, Gūshkī-ye Pā’īn, Koshki, and Kūshkī-ye Pā’īn) is a village in Oshtorinan Rural District, Oshtorinan District, Borujerd County, Lorestan Province, Iran. At the 2006 census, its population was 368, in 86 families.

References 

Towns and villages in Borujerd County